Ditrigona polyobotaria is a moth in the family Drepanidae. It was described by Oberthur in 1923. It is found in China.

The wingspan is about 20 mm. The forewings are white with the transverse fasciae pale yellowish brown. There are narrow subterminal and sub-basal fasciae and two broad fasciae medial to the end of the cell. The hindwings are as the forewings, but without the sub-basal fascia.

References

Moths described in 1923
Drepaninae
Moths of Asia